Bembridge Down is a  Site of special scientific interest which is north-east of Sandown, Isle of Wight, England. The site was notified in 1951 for both its biological and geological features.

References

Natural England citation sheet

Sites of Special Scientific Interest on the Isle of Wight
Hills of the Isle of Wight
Bembridge